The Illinois–Iowa League was a Minor league baseball league which operated in Illinois, Iowa and Indiana from 1890 to 1892.

History
The Illinois–Iowa League began play in 1890 and was nicknamed as the "Two I League". The Aurora Hoodoos, Cedar Rapids Canaries, Dubuque Giants, Joliet Convicts, Monmouth Maple Cities, Ottawa Pirates, Ottumwa Coal Palaces and Sterling Blue Coats began play on May 1, 1890, as charter members.

The Ottumwa Coal Palace Kings(1890), Quincy Ravens (1891) and Joliet Convicts (1892) were the league champions.

Cities Represented 
 Aurora, IL: Aurora Hoodoos 1890; Aurora Maroons 1891; Aurora Indians 1892 
 Burlington, IA: Burlington 1890 
 Cedar Rapids, IA: Cedar Rapids Canaries 1890–1891 
 Davenport, IA: Davenport Pilgrims 1891 
 Dubuque, IA: Dubuque Giants 1890 
 Evansville, IN: Evansville Hoosiers 1892 
 Galesburg, IL: Galesburg 1890 
 Jacksonville, IL: Jacksonville Lunatics 1892 
 Joliet, IL: Joliet Convicts 1890; Joliet Giants 1891; Joliet Convicts 1892
 Monmouth, IL: Monmouth Maple Cities 1890 
 Ottawa, IL: Ottawa Pirates 1890; Ottawa Modocs 1891 
 Ottumwa, IA: Ottumwa Coal Palaces 1890–1891 
 Peoria, IL: Peoria Distillers 1892 
 Quincy, IL: Quincy Ravens 1891–1892 
 Rock Island, IL/Moline, IL: Rock Island-Moline Twins 1892 
 Rockford, IL: Rockford Hustlers 1891–1892 
 Sterling, IL: Sterling Blue Coats 1890 
 Terre Haute, IN: Terre Haute Hottentots 1892

Standings and statistics 
1890 Illinois–Iowa League
 Sterling (21–51) transferred to Galesburg July 31; Galesburg (8–17) transferred to Burlington September 4; Burlington disbanded September 10.

1891 Illinois–Iowa League
schedule
Aurora disbanded June 17.Davenport disbanded July 22.Ottumwa and Cedar Rapids disbanded September 2.
 
1892 Illinois–Iowa League
schedule
Peoria (17–8) moved to Aurora May 31; Aurora disbanded July 5. Quincy disbanded June 24. Evansville disbanded July 8. Terre Haute disbanded July 10.

References

External links
Baseball-Reference (Minors)

Baseball leagues in Illinois
Baseball leagues in Iowa
Baseball leagues in Indiana
Defunct minor baseball leagues in the United States
Sports leagues established in 1890
Sports leagues disestablished in 1892
1890 establishments in Illinois
1890 establishments in Iowa
1892 disestablishments in Iowa
1892 disestablishments in Illinois